Fuyong station  is an interchange station for Line 11 and Line 12 of Shenzhen Metro in Guangdong Province. The station serves Fuyong Subdistrict.

Station layout

Exits

References

Railway stations in Guangdong
Shenzhen Metro stations
Railway stations in China opened in 2016